Rhodoprasina callantha, the small olive hawkmoth, is a species of moth of the family Sphingidae. It is found from north-eastern India across south-western China and northern Thailand to northern Vietnam.

The wingspan is 90–120 mm. It is a sexually dimorphic species, with females often being considerably larger than males. Adults have sharply pointed, olive-green (male) or tawny-olive (female) forewings crossed by diagonal dark lines and diffuse white bands. The hindwing is carmine above with the costal and anal margins olive-green. The body is olive-green and darker below. The antennae are pink and the tibiae and tarsi are blackish and grey.

Adults are on wing from January to April and again from August to November in Thailand.

The larvae have been recorded feeding on Quercus species, including Quercus fenestrata in India.

References

Rhodoprasina
Moths described in 1929